Romulo Geolina Valles, D.D. (born July 10, 1951), is the current archbishop of the Archdiocese of Davao in Davao City, on the island of Mindanao, Philippines and the president of the Catholic Bishops' Conference of the Philippines since December 1, 2017. He was the former archbishop of Zamboanga before being appointed to the Davao see.

Biography
He was ordained a priest on 6 April 1976 at the age of 24. On 6 August 1997, aged 46, he was elevated to a bishop, and appointed to Kidapawan, Philippines. After 9 years, he was elevated to Archbishop of Zamboanga on 13 November 2006. He was appointed Archbishop of Davao on February 12, 2012, Valles took over the Davao archdiocese from Archbishop Fernando Capalla, 77, whose resignation has been accepted by the pontiff. The new archbishop was installed in a solemn liturgical rite of reception in which he canonically took possession of the metropolitan cathedral church, the San Pedro Cathedral, on May 22, 2012, in the presence of Papal Nuncio to the Philippines, Archbishop Giuseppe Pinto, cardinals, other archbishops, bishops, priests, and laity from Davao City, and all over the country.

Valles was elected on July 8, 2017 as President of the Catholic Bishops' Conference of the Philippines, succeeding Lingayen-Dagupan Archbishop Socrates Villegas, assuming the post on December 1, 2017. He was reelected to the same position in 2019.

On 23 May 2020, Valles suffered a mild stroke and was hospitalized until July 6 due to an acquired hospital pneumonia. Pablo Virgilio David, vice-president of the CBCP, was temporarily appointed acting president. In July 2021, David was elected president by the CBCP and succeeded Valles assuming the position last December 1, 2021.

References

20th-century Roman Catholic bishops in the Philippines
21st-century Roman Catholic archbishops in the Philippines
1951 births
Living people
People from Bohol
Roman Catholic archbishops of Zamboanga
Roman Catholic archbishops of Davao
Presidents of the Catholic Bishops' Conference of the Philippines